"Before You Go" is a 1965 title track of the album by Buck Owens.  "Before You Go" was co-written by Owens, along with Don Rich.  The single was Owens's seventh release to hit number one on the U.S. country singles chart where it spent six weeks at the top and total of twenty weeks on the chart.

Chart performance

References

1965 singles
Buck Owens songs
Songs written by Buck Owens
Song recordings produced by Ken Nelson (American record producer)
Songs written by Don Rich
Capitol Records singles
1965 songs